Mount Maere is a mountain,  high, on the west side of Norsk Polarinstitutt Glacier immediately southwest of Mount Bastin, in the Belgica Mountains of Antarctica. It was discovered by the Belgian Antarctic Expedition, 1957–58, under G. de Gerlache, who named it for Xavier de Maere d'Aertrijcke, second-in-command and chief meteorologist of the expedition.

References

Mountains of Queen Maud Land
Princess Ragnhild Coast